Kayapınar, also known as Aynkaf, is a municipality (belde) in the Gercüş District of Batman Province in Turkey. The village is populated by Arabs and by Kurds of the Kercoz tribe. It had a population of 2,303 in 2021.

References 

Kurdish settlements in Batman Province
Arab settlements in Batman Province
Populated places in Batman Province
Towns in Turkey
Gercüş District